is a game for the Nintendo DS developed by Konami.

Critical response
Iron Feather received an overall score of 29/40 from Famitsu (individual reviews:7/8/7/7).

References

External links
Preview at 1up.com

Role-playing video games
Japan-exclusive video games
Nintendo DS games
Nintendo DS-only games
Action role-playing video games
2006 video games
Video games developed in Japan